The 1927 Thuringia state election was held on 30 January 1927 to elect the 56 members of the Landtag of Thuringia.

Results

References 

Thuringia
Elections in Thuringia
January 1927 events